Tapesco, is a district of the Zarcero canton, in the Alajuela province of Costa Rica. While its official name is Tapesco as recognized in the Administrative Territorial Division, it is also seldom and colloquially written as Tapezco.

Geography 
Tapesco has an area of  km² and an elevation of  metres.

Demographics 

For the 2011 census, Tapesco had a population of  inhabitants.

Transportation

Road transportation 
The district is covered by the following road routes:
 National Route 141

References 

Districts of Alajuela Province
Populated places in Alajuela Province